Ki Sarmidi Mangunsarkoro (23 May 1904 – 8 June 1957) acted as the Minister of Education and Culture of Indonesia in 1949 until 1950. He is now regarded as a National Hero of Indonesia.

Early life
Ki Sarmidi Mangunsarkoro was born May 23, 1904 in Surakarta. After graduated from the "Arjuna" Teacher School in Jakarta, he worked as a teacher in a Taman Siswa school in Yogyakarta.

Education goals

In 1930-1938 Mangunsarkoro was a Member of the Indonesian National Scout Management (KBI), and advocate for the movement to be free from the influence of Dutch colonialism. His work on education was being recognized inside the Indonesian National Party (PNI). In 1928 he appeared as a speaker at the 28 October 1928 Youth Congress, advocating children's right to get national education and be educated democratically, and the need for a balance between education at school and at home.

Minister of Education

During the Hatta II government from August 1949 until January 1950, Ki Sarmidi Mangunsarkoro worked as the Minister of Education, Teaching and Culture (PP and K) of the Republic of Indonesia.

Notes

References

National Heroes of Indonesia